Eppur Si Muove is the third full-length album by the German symphonic metal band Haggard. It was released on 26 April 2004 by Drakkar Entertainment.

The album is based on the life of the Italian astronomer Galileo Galilei (1564–1642), who, according to legend, muttered the phrase eppur si muove, meaning "And yet it does move", after being forced to recant, in front of the Inquisition, his belief that the earth moved around the sun.

In 2021, it was elected by Metal Hammer as the 23rd best symphonic metal album.

The following is a musical theme recurring in many tracks on the album (as All'inizio è la morte, Per aspera ad astra and the titletrack Eppur si muove):

Track listing 

 English translations not official.

The short version of Herr Mannelig clocks at 3:20; after two minutes of silence, a hidden track starts.

Limited edition 
The limited edition includes two bonus tracks.

"De la morte noir" (The Black Death)  – 7:59
"Robin's Song"  – 4:36

It also includes a DVD, containing five Wacken Open Air 1998 videos and a bonus video clip.

"Requiem"
"In a Pale Moon's Shadow"
"Cantus firmus" (Chant of Strength)
"De la morte noir"
"Lost (Robin)"
"In a Pale Moon's Shadow" (bonus video clip)

References

External links 
 Eppur si muove at Encyclopaedia Metallum

2004 albums
Haggard (band) albums